Lawrence Cribbin (27 August 1880 – 15 October 1962) was an Irish Gaelic footballer who played as a goalkeeper for the Kildare senior team. 

Cribbin made his first appearance for the team during the 1901 championship and was a regular member of the starting fifteen until his retirement after the 1920 championship. During that time he won two All-Ireland medals and three Leinster medals. Cribbin was an All-Ireland runner-up on one occasion.

At club level, Cribbin won fourteen county club championship medals in both hurling and football with his home club of Clane.

References

1880 births
1962 deaths
Kildare inter-county hurlers
Kildare inter-county Gaelic footballers
Leinster inter-provincial Gaelic footballers
Winners of two All-Ireland medals (Gaelic football)
Clane hurlers
Clane Gaelic footballers